Africa Today is a peer-reviewed, interdisciplinary academic journal with articles about contemporary Africa. It was founded in 1954 and is published quarterly by the Indiana University Press. The editors accept submissions based on original research in any humanities and social science discipline. The journal publishes research articles, commentaries, and book reviews. Past special issues have focused on migration and social class, the future of African artistic practices, and family-based healthcare in Ghana. According to Project MUSE, it "publishes peer-reviewed, scholarly articles and book reviews in a broad range of academic disciplines on topics related to contemporary Africa" and "seek[s] to be a venue for interdisciplinary approaches, diverse perspectives and original research in the humanities and social sciences." It is indexed in CABI, EBSCOhost, Scopus, Gale, ProQuest, and Sage Publications, Inc., among other places.

References

African studies journals
Publications established in 1954
Indiana University Press academic journals
English-language journals